Silvia-Sorina Munteanu (born in Ghioroc, Arad County) is a Romanian opera singer.

Munteanu made her debut in 1996 in Georges Bizet's Carmen. She has been a soloist at the Romanian National Opera, Timișoara, at the Romanian National Opera, Cluj-Napoca, and since 2003 at the Romanian National Opera, Bucharest. Aside from her native country, she has performed in Frankfurt, Essen, Sofia, Varna, Prague, Bratislava, and Budapest, as well as at festivals in other European countries, Thailand, and the United States.

Notes

External links

People from Arad County
Romanian operatic sopranos
Living people
21st-century Romanian women opera singers
Year of birth missing (living people)